Major General Ben Sternberg (28 February 19142 January 2004) was a United States Army officer who served in World War II and the Vietnam War.

Early life
Sternberg was born in Starke, Florida on 28 February 1914. He enlisted in the Florida National Guard on 2 July 1930 and attended the Marion Military Institute.

Military career
Sternberg enlisted in the Regular Army on 2 July 1933 and was subsequently appointed to the United States Military Academy. He graduated from West Point with a B.S. degree on 14 June 1938 and was commissioned as a second lieutenant of infantry.

In March 1943 as a lieutenant colonel he commanded the 2nd Battalion, 18th Infantry Regiment, 1st Infantry Division in combat at the Battle of El Guettar, Tunisia. For his actions he was awarded the Distinguished Service Cross. During the Allied invasion of Sicily he led the 2/18th Infantry when it captured Ponte Olivo Airfield.

After the war, Sternberg graduated from the Command and General Staff College in 1948 and the Army War College in 1953. From 1948 to 1951, he taught tactics at West Point. From 1953 to 1954, Sternberg was deployed to Korea, commanding the 5th Regimental Combat Team and serving at the 8th Army headquarters.

From January 1964 to March 1996 he served as a J-1 Manpower and Personnel Directorate, Military Assistance Command, Vietnam. He was promoted to Major general on 1 February 1965.

From March 1966 to July 1967 he commanded the 101st Airborne Division. The Associated Press on 9 June 1966 reported him saying that the U.S. would need 500,000 more troops to seal off the borders of South Vietnam from infiltration, that Premier Nguyễn Cao Kỳ would probably have to step aside given the repercussions of the Buddhist Uprising and that a U.S. defeat in Vietnam was a possibility. On 23 July 1966 he escorted President Lyndon B. Johnson on an inspection of the division.

In 1971 he commanded the 25th Infantry Division.

His final assignment was as commanding general U.S. Army, Hawaii.

Later life
He retired from the U.S. Army in Hawaii. He died on 2 January 2004 at Tripler Army Medical Center, Hawaii and was buried at Arlington National Cemetery.

Decorations
His decorations include the Distinguished Service Cross, the Distinguished Service Medal, the Silver Star, the Legion of Merit and three awards of the Bronze Star Medal.

References

1914 births
2004 deaths
People from Starke, Florida
Florida National Guard personnel
Marion Military Institute alumni
United States Army soldiers
United States Military Academy alumni
United States Army personnel of World War II
Recipients of the Silver Star
Recipients of the Distinguished Service Cross (United States)
Recipients of the Legion of Merit
United States Army Command and General Staff College alumni
United States Military Academy faculty
United States Army War College alumni
United States Army generals
United States Army personnel of the Vietnam War
Recipients of the Distinguished Service Medal (US Army)
People from Honolulu
Burials at Arlington National Cemetery